Vagn Joensen is a Danish jurist who served as President and Presiding Judge of the United Nations International Criminal Tribunal for Rwanda (ICTR). He is presently a judge at the International Residual Mechanism for Criminal Tribunals, which succeeded the ICTR.

References 

Year of birth missing (living people)
Living people
Judges of United Nations courts and tribunals
20th-century Danish judges
21st-century Danish judges